Horst Jürgen Helle (born July 19, 1934) is a German sociologist, who is currently Professor Emeritus at the Ludwig Maximilian University of Munich in Munich, Germany.

Career
Horst Helle received a business degree from the university in his hometown of Hamburg before receiving an MBA from the University of Kansas on a Fulbright Scholarship, 1956-1957. Thereupon, he returned to the University of Hamburg and obtained the Ph.D. in sociology as well as the license to teach sociology as Privatdozent. He has since held tenured professorships at the RWTH Aachen University, the University of Vienna, and the University of Munich where, between 1973 and 2002, he was Professor of Sociology and Co-director of the Institute for Sociology. Over the course of his career, Helle has also taught at universities in several other countries, including a year as a research fellow at the University of Chicago and, since 1996, in mainland China.

Contributions to sociology
Helle's work is mainly concerned with analyzing the development of Symbolic Interactionism since Herbert Blumer, although he does not single out Blumer's contribution. Instead the latter is positioned and discussed in the context of the evolution of the so-called 'Verstehen' tradition of interpretive sociology. Helle has specifically looked at the path taken by European sociology in its tension between positivism and neo-Kantianism since the writing of Georg Simmel. He connects this tradition to Blumer's indebtedness to George Herbert Mead, the widely acknowledged “father” of Symbolic Interactionism. In this theoretical continuity Helle also discusses the work of Anselm Strauss, Tamotsu Shibutani and, particularly, Erving Goffman. Most of Helle’s substantive work has centered on cultural change, religion, the family, and recently mainland China.

Selected bibliography
Verstehende Soziologie und Theorie der Symbolischen Interaktion. Stuttgart: B. G. Teubner, 1977.
Symbolic Interaction and Verstehen. Frankfurt am Main/New York: Peter Lang, 2005.
Messages from Georg Simmel. Leiden: Brill, 2013. 
China: Promise or Threat? A Comparison of Cultures. Leiden: Brill, 2016.
Refugees, Religions, and Social Change: Essays on China and the Failing West. Munich, 2019.

References

External links
Horst Helle Website
Horst Jürgen Helle webpage at Ludwig-Maximilians-Universität
Horst J. Helle - A Journey into Sociology

German sociologists
University of Kansas alumni
1934 births
Living people
Academic staff of the Ludwig Maximilian University of Munich
University of Hamburg alumni